The 1st Standing Committee of the Workers' Party of North Korea (WPNK)(1차 북조선로동당 상무위원회) was elected at the 1st WPNK Congress held in August 1946. It consisted of 13 members and remained active until the election of the 2nd Standing Committee by the 1st Plenary Session of the 2nd Central Committee on 30 March 1948. In between sessions of the Standing Committee, the Political Committee met in its place.

Members

Political Committee(정치위원회)
 Kim Tu-bong as Chairman
 Kim Il-sung as Vice Chairman
 Chu Yong-ha as Vice Chairman
 Ho Ka-i
 Choe Chang-ik

Standing Committee(상임위원회)
 Kim Tu-bong as Chairman
 Kim Il-sung as Vice Chairman
 Chu Yong-ha as Vice Chairman
 Ho Ka-i
 Choe Chang-ik
 Pak Il-u
 Kim Chang-man
 Kim Chaek
 Pak Chong-ae
 Pak Hyo-sam
 Pak Chang-sik
 Kim Il
 Kim Chae-uk

References

Footnotes

Bibliography

 

1st Central Committee of the Workers' Party of North Korea
1946 in North Korea